Discovering Psychology is a PBS documentary on psychology presented by Philip Zimbardo, for which he received the Carl Sagan Award for Public Understanding of Science. The series was released in 1990, with an updated edition comprising three additional episodes in 2001.

Episodes 

 Sensation and Perception
 Understanding Research
 Remembering and Forgetting
 Cognitive Processes
 Judgment and Decision Making
 Motivation and Emotion
 The Mind Awake and Asleep
 The Mind Hidden and Divided
 The Self
 Testing and Intelligence
 Sex and Gender
 Maturing and Aging
 The Power of the Situation
 Constructing Social Reality
 Psychopathology
 Psychotherapy
 Health, Mind, and Behavior
 Applying Psychology in Life
 Cognitive Neuroscience
 Cultural Psychology

References

External links 
 Discovering Psychology - Companion website

1990 American television series debuts
2001 American television series endings
1990s American documentary television series
2000s American documentary television series
Documentaries about psychology
Science education television series
PBS original programming